"Steal My Girl" is a song written and recorded by English-Irish boy band One Direction. It is the lead single from their fourth studio album Four (2014). It was released worldwide on 29 September 2014. The single was written by band members Louis Tomlinson and Liam Payne and regular collaborators Jonathan Cain, Wayne Hector, John Ryan, Ed Drewett and Julian Bunetta (the four had previously written "Best Song Ever"). It was produced by Julian Bunetta, John Ryan and Pär Westerlund. They also performed this song for the first time on their fourth concert tour, the On the Road Again Tour.

Background and release
The announcement was first made on band member Liam Payne's Twitter on 14 September. The single became available worldwide on 29 September, except in the United Kingdom. The song was made available in the United Kingdom on 12 October, with Payne's remix of the recording (dubbed as the Big Payno and Afterhrs Pool Party Remix) being the B-side. The song's co-writer Louis Tomlinson stated the song is a "feel good song and it’s not too far away from the last album (Midnight Memories)." On 28 September, one day prior to the official release, the song was leaked on the internet.

Composition and lyrics
The song's piano piece of the instrumental was similar to Journey's "Faithfully". A reviewer felt the song sounded reminiscent of 1980s music, something that the band emphasized on their previous studio album. The lyrics fret over the potential for rivals to take the group's girlfriends away from them, and why they matter to them.

Critical reception
The song received acclaim from music critics. Lucas Villa of AXS praised One Direction's classic rock sound of "Steal My Girl", noting similarities to Journey's "Faithfully". He wrote that "the guys have been digging in their parents' record collections" and added "[it's] a pretty neat and new direction for the band." Samantha Highfill of Entertainment Weekly suggests that the song is "dad-friendly", emphasizing on the classic rock sound. Billboard gave the song four and a half out of five stars, stating it "represents the group's most tremendous Van Halen impression yet." Jim Farber from the Daily News reviews the single as a throwback to the 1970s/80s due to the arena rock ballad.

Jim Farber, writing for the New York Daily News, wrote that the song "boasts a sumptuous production and a chorus guaranteed to make young girls around the world swoon" while adding that it "boasts a melody that sounds like it could have come off a '70s or '80s arena-rock ballad by Journey or Foreigner. The warmly synthesized arrangement also echos the style of that particular era of homogenized pop". Christina Lee of Idolator commented that "the song is clearly a hit" as it "morphs into a soaring stadium pop anthem with hard-hitting drum machine beats, glassy piano chords and that playground chant of a hook". Mikael Wood of The Baltimore Sun commented that "One Direction is going dad rock" and that the song is a "journey to the '80s".

Upon the release of "Steal My Girl", Hayley Williams and Chad Gilbert pointed the similarities between the song and New Found Glory's "It's Not Your Fault".

Chart performance
"Steal My Girl" ranked number three on the UK Singles Chart, the eighth song from the group to have peaked top-three in the UK Singles Chart. "Steal My Girl" reached number 13 on the US Billboard Hot 100.

Music video
The accompanying music video was directed by Ben and Gabe Turner. The clip featured appearances from Danny DeVito, a juvenile chimpanzee, sumo wrestlers Yamamotoyama Ryūta and Ulambayaryn Byambajav, acrobats and a marching band. Also in the video appears Julie Zetlin, a retired rhythmic gymnast from the United States wearing a leotard previous worn by Belarusian rhythmic gymnast Inna Zhukova.

In the music video, DeVito meets up with the group in the middle of the desert where a video shoot is being set up. DeVito is serving as their visionary director. He dubs each of the members of the group a different expression: Harry is love, Niall is light, Liam is power, Louis is danger, and Zayn is mystery. From there, the song starts with Liam smashing a row of silver balls that spell "inhibitions" and Zayn is seen with two sumo wrestlers. Niall is seen to be dancing with a Maasai tribe from Tanzania, and Liam is seen as a leader of a marching band. Harry is seen surrounded by masked female ballet dancers, and Louis is seen with the chimpanzee, as well as a lion, a flock of sheep and flamingos. DeVito appears with the group throughout the video. In the end, a rain effect is used on the lot, where the group, DeVito, and all other acts appear together in one shot resembling a mix of Cirque du Soleil and Coachella.

Track listing
Digital download
"Steal My Girl"

UK digital download
"Steal My Girl"
"Steal My Girl" 

CD single
"Steal My Girl"
"Steal My Girl"

Charts

Weekly charts

Year-end charts

Certifications

Release history

References

2014 singles
One Direction songs
Syco Music singles
Columbia Records singles
2014 songs
Songs written by Ed Drewett
Songs written by Julian Bunetta
Songs written by Wayne Hector
Songs written by John Ryan (musician)
Songs written by Louis Tomlinson
Songs written by Liam Payne
Song recordings produced by Julian Bunetta
Number-one singles in Denmark
Number-one singles in Greece